= Vila Ipiranga =

Vila Ipiranga is a neighbourhood (bairro) in the city of Porto Alegre, the state capital of Rio Grande do Sul, in Brazil. It was created by Law 2022 from December 7, 1959.

Nowadays, Vila Ipiranga is a middle class residential neighbourhood. Many schools and squares are located here.
